William Anthony Kirby (born 2 June 1981) is an English cricketer.  Kirby is a right-handed batsman who bowls right-arm medium pace.  He was born in Hull, Yorkshire.

Kirby represented the Nottinghamshire Cricket Board in a single List A match against the Gloucestershire Cricket Board in the 1st round of the 2000 NatWest Trophy.  In his only List A match, he scored 3 runs.

In 2002, he played 2 first-class matches for Durham UCCE against Durham and Nottinghamshire.  In those 2 matches, he scored 78 runs at a batting average of 26.00, with a high score of 37, while in the field he took 2 catches.

In 2009, he joined Lincolnshire, making his debut for the county in the Minor Counties Championship against Norfolk.  From 2009 to present, he has represented the county in 7 Championship matches.  Is debut for Lincolnshire in the MCCA Knockout Trophy came against Norfolk in 2009, and to present he has played 2 further Trophy matches for the county.

References

External links
William Kirby at Cricinfo

1981 births
Living people
Cricketers from Kingston upon Hull
English cricketers
Nottinghamshire Cricket Board cricketers
Durham MCCU cricketers
Lincolnshire cricketers
English cricketers of the 21st century